This is a list of lakes of Burkina Faso.

B
 Lake Bam
 Lake Boukou

D
 Lake Dem

H
 Lake Higa

K
 Lake Kompienga

M
Mare aux Hippopotames
Mare d'Oursi

T
 Lake Tengrela

See also

References

Burkina Faso
Lakes